KXPD may refer to:

 KXPD (AM), a radio station (1040 AM) licensed to Tigard, Oregon, United States
 KXPD-LP, a low-power television station (channel 52) licensed to Eola, Oregon, United States